Zwanowice may refer to:

Zwanowice, Brzeg County, Opole Voivodeship (south-west Poland)
Zwanowice, Nysa County, Opole Voivodeship (south-west Poland)
Żwanowice, Kuyavian-Pomeranian Voivodeship (north-central Poland)